The 1983–84 New Jersey Devils season was the 10th season for the National Hockey League franchise that was established on June 11, 1974, and second season since the franchise relocated from Colorado prior to the 1982–83 NHL season. The Devils finished again in fifth place and did not qualify for the playoffs.

Offseason

Regular season

All Star Game 
The 36th National Hockey League All-Star Game was played at Brendan Byrne Arena on January 31, 1984. The Wales Conference defeated the Campbell Conference 7–6. Chico Resch, Joe Cirella, and trainers Keith Parker and Craig Smith participated in the All Star Game as representatives of the Wales Conference.

Final standings

Schedule and results

Playoffs

Player statistics

Regular season
Scoring

Goaltending

Note: GP = Games played; G = Goals; A = Assists; Pts = Points; +/- = Plus/minus; PIM = Penalty minutes; PPG=Power-play goals; SHG=Short-handed goals; GWG=Game-winning goals
      MIN=Minutes played; W = Wins; L = Losses; T = Ties; GA = Goals against; GAA = Goals against average; SO = Shutouts;

Awards and records

Transactions

Draft picks
New Jersey's draft picks at the 1983 NHL Entry Draft held at the Montreal Forum in Montreal, Quebec.

Farm teams

See also
1983–84 NHL season

References

External links

New Jersey Devils seasons
New Jersey Devils
New Jersey Devils
New Jersey Devils
New Jersey Devils
20th century in East Rutherford, New Jersey
Meadowlands Sports Complex
National Hockey League All-Star Game hosts